The 3rd constituency of Ille-et-Vilaine is a French legislative constituency in the Ille-et-Vilaine département. Like the other 576 French constituencies, it elects one MP using the two-round system, with a run-off if no candidate receives over 50% of the vote in the first round.

3rd constituency from 1958 until 1986

Geographic description 
Following the 1958 redistricting of French legislative constituencies, Ille-et-Vilaine's 3rd constituency was centered around the commune of Vitré. The department contained 6 constituencies at the time, and the constituency was composed of the following cantons:

 Canton of Argentré-du-Plessis
 Canton of Châteaubourg
 Canton of La Guerche-de-Bretagne
 Canton of Janzé
 Canton of Retiers
 Canton of Vitré-Est
 Canton of Vitré-Ouest

List of deputies between 1958 and 1986

3rd constituency from 1986 until 2010

List of deputies between 1986 and 2010

Election results

2007

2002

1997

1993

3rd constituency since 2010

Geographic description 
Following the 2010 redistricting of French legislative constituencies, induced by ordinance no 2009-935 of 29 July 2009 and ratified by the French Parliament on 21 January 2010, Ille-et-Vilaine's 3rd constituency contains the following administrative divisions:

 Canton of Bécherel
 Canton of Combourg
 Canton of Montauban-de-Bretagne
 Canton of Montfort-sur-Meu
 Canton of Rennes-Nord-Ouest
 Canton of Saint-Méen-le-Grand
 Canton of Tinténiac.

List of deputies since 2010

Election results

2012 
The 2012 French legislative elections took place on 10 June 2012 and 17 June 2012, consecutive Sundays.

2017 
The 2017 French legislative elections took place on 11 June 2017 and 18 June 2017, consecutive Sundays.

2022

 
 
 
 
 
 
|-
| colspan="8" bgcolor="#E9E9E9"|
|-

References

See also 
 INSEE's slip of this constituency: 
 List of Ille-et-Vilaine's deputies from 1789: 
 Official results of French elections from 1998: 

3